MBT may refer to:

Armaments
Main battle tank
MBT 1925, an Italian  rifle

Businesses
Manitoba Telecom Services, traded as MBT on the TSX
MTS (network provider), traded as MBT on the NYSE
Masai Barefoot Technology, a brand of rocker bottom shoes
Massachusetts business trust, United States, a type of business 
Tech Mahindra (formerly Mahindra British Telecom)
Metropolitan Bank and Trust Company, Philippines, a bank
Monroe Bank & Trust, a holding company in Michigan, United States

Places (including buildings etc.)
The National Rail code for Marsh Barton railway station under construction in the Marsh Barton area of Exeter, England
Mont Blanc Tunnel, between France and Italy 
Mount Baker Theatre, Bellingham, Washington, US
Mountbatten MRT station, Singapore
Moises R. Espinosa Airport, Philippines (IATA code) 
Murfreesboro Municipal Airport, Tennessee, United States (FAA LID code) 
Metropolitan Branch Trail, a hiking/cycling route, north-east United States

Science and technology

Biology and medicine
Malignant brain tumor
Mentalization-based treatment
Methylbutyltryptamine, a lesser-known psychedelic drug
Midblastula transition in embryonic development 
Mind-body training, such as yoga, tai chi and Pilates

Other uses in science and technology
Main Boundary Thrust, Himalayas, a geologic fault 
Maximum brake torque, a tuning setting at which an engine achieves maximum torque
Model-based testing, a software testing approach
3-Methyl-2-butene-1-thiol, a compound sometimes found in beer that is similar in chemical composition and odor to the spray of a skunk
Mechanical biological treatment, for sewage 
Mercaptobenzothiozole, used as an accelerant in vulcanisation processes

Other uses
Majlis Bachao Tehreek, a political party in the Indian state of Telangana
Manufacturing Business Technology, a website
Master of Business Taxation, an academic qualification 
The Monster Ball Tour, 2009–2011 Lady Gaga world tour
MBT (board game), a wargame involving tanks
 Matigsalug language of Mindanao
 Modified Brussels Treaty of 1954, a mutual defence agreement between European countries